The Elektrolytes are an all-male dance crew formed by a group of local dancers within the area of Gilbert, Arizona in 2006. They are the winner of the seventh season of America's Best Dance Crew. They are also the winners of Hip Hop International USA 2011 Adult Division, and finished seventh in the World Hip Hop International 2011 Finals.

History
Before forming Elektrolytes, they were all friends in school and years later they decided to make a dance crew naming themselves Elektrolytes as dance fuels their body and it's what plants crave. 
The crew auditioned for America's Best Dance Crew three times, failing to pass each time. After placing first at HHI 2011 USA for the Adult Division, the crew decided to audition for ABDC and passed.

ABDC 7

Elektrolytes were declared ABDC Champions on the Live Finale June 13, 2012.

Injuries
Member Chris Thomas injured his knee during rehearsal and missed the performances of weeks 2 and 3.

Post-ABDC
After ABDC, the Elektrolytes competed again at the 2012 Hip Hop International. They received silver in the USA Adult Division and 4th Place in the World Adult Division. The Elektrolytes were dancing while traveling on tour, but now are on ABDC season 8.

References

External links
 Elektrolytes at YouTube
 Elektrolytes at Facebook
 Elektrolytes at Twitter
 Profile on MTV.com

America's Best Dance Crew winners
American hip hop dance groups